The  is a waterway connecting Tokyo Bay to the Sagami Gulf. It is an important channel for ships headed from Tokyo, Yokohama, and Chiba to the Pacific Ocean and beyond.

Geography

The Uraga channel is at the southern end of Tokyo Bay (formerly known as Edo Bay, prior to 1868).

Tokyo Bay is surrounded by the Bōsō Peninsula (Chiba Prefecture) to the east and the Miura Peninsula (Kanagawa Prefecture) to the west. This area covers about 922 km². Tokyo Bay, in a broader sense, would be understood to include the Uraga Channel as well (its southwestern demarcation being the straight line between the Tsurugisaki Lighthouse and Sunosaki Lighthouse); and the total area of the bay would then be 1320 km².

The city of Uraga is located at the northern end of the channel on the Miura Peninsula.  Due to its strategic location at the entrance of Edo Bay, Uraga has often been the first point of contact between visiting foreign ships and Japan.

At its narrowest, between Cape Kannon and Futtsu Point, the channel is 6 km wide.  During the late Edo period, it was defended against foreign ships by twelve artillery batteries on both the Bōsō Peninsula and Miura Peninsula.

History

In 1846, Captain James Biddle of the U.S. Navy anchored two warships, the U.S.S. Columbus and the U.S.S. Vincennes in Uraga Channel at the mouth to Tokyo Bay.  This was a step in what turned out to be an unsuccessful effort to open Japan to trade with the United States.

On July 14, 1853, Commodore Perry lowered the anchor of the squadron the Japanese called the Black ships near Uraga at Kurihama (in present-day Yokosuka in Kanagawa Prefecture) at the mouth of the channel.  On the return of the Commodore's squadron in 1854, the ships by-passed Uraga to anchor closer to Edo at Kanagawa, which is where the city of Yokohama now stands.

Notes

References
 Cullen, L.M. (2003). A History of Japan, 1582-1941: Internal and External Worlds. Cambridge: Cambridge University Press.  (cloth).  (paper)
 Sewall, John S. (1905). The Logbook of the Captain's Clerk: Adventures in the China Seas, Bangor, Maine: Chas H. Glass & Co. [reprint by Chicago: R.R. Donnelly & Sons, 1995]

External links
 Maritime Traffic, 3rd Regional Coast Guard Headquarters:  Uraga Suido Traffic Route
 National Archives of Japan, Digital Gallery: Marine survey chart:  Tokyo bay, Kuwanonsaki to Koshiba, published 1876

Bodies of water of Japan
Channels